Anders Bloch Bærtelsen (born 9 May 2000) is a Danish professional footballer who plays as a centre back for FK Haugesund.

Club career

AaB 
Bærtelsen made his first team superliga debut on April 29, 2018 against FC Midtjylland in the Danish Superliga.

In December 2018, Bærtelsen went on a 10-day trial at English club West Bromwich Albion and did well, according to the club. Before they offered him a contract, AaB did, and he agreed and signed a contract until June 2021 starting from the 2019/20 season, where he also would be promoted permanently to the first team squad.

Vendsyssel FF
On 7 August 2020, Bærtelsen moved to Vendsyssel FF to find more space, signing a four-year deal with the club from the Danish 1st Division.

Haugesund
After a good season in Vendsyssel, Bærtelsen was sold to Norwegian Eliteserien club FK Haugesund on 17 August 2021, signing a deal until the end of 2025.

References

External links
Anders Bærtelsen at DBU 

2000 births
Living people
Danish men's footballers
Danish expatriate men's footballers
Sportspeople from Aalborg
Association football defenders
Denmark youth international footballers
AaB Fodbold players
Vendsyssel FF players
FK Haugesund players
Danish Superliga players
Danish 1st Division players
Eliteserien players
Danish expatriate sportspeople in Norway
Expatriate footballers in Norway